Peter Courtenay was a bishop.

Peter Courtenay may also refer to:

Sir Peter Courtenay (died 1405) (1346–1405), soldier and knight
Sir Peter Courtenay (died 1552), of Ugbrooke, Sheriff of Devon in 1548/9
Peter Courtenay (cricketer) (1914–1959), English cricketer

See also
Peter Courtney (disambiguation)